Kuntur Puñuna (quechua kuntur condor, puñuna bed, "condor bed",  Hispanicized spelling Condor Puñuna) is a mountain in the Andes of Peru, about  high. It is located in the Puno Region, Lampa Province, Santa Lucía District.

References

Mountains of Puno Region
Mountains of Peru